Ganime may refer to: 

 , a fictional kaiju from the Japanese science fiction film, Space Amoeba
 G-Anime, an anime convention held every year in Gatineau, Quebec, Canada
 , a project initiated in 2006 by the Japanese publisher Gentosha and the animation studio Toei Animation that features still-animated films